Country Girl(s) may refer to:

Literature
 Country Girl (memoir), a 2012 book by Edna O'Brien

Music
 A Country Girl, a long-running British 1902 musical
 Country Girls (band), a Japanese female idol group

Albums
 Country Girl (Dottie West album) or the title song (see below), 1968
 Country Girl (Billie Jo Spears album), 1970
 Country Girl (Miriam Makeba album) or the title song, 1978
 Country Girl (Rebecca Hollweg album) or the title song, 2015
 Country Girl (Zahara album) or the title song, 2015
 Country Girl, by Jeannie C. Riley, or the title song, 1970

Songs
 "Country Girl" (Crosby, Stills, Nash & Young song), 1970
 "Country Girl" (Dottie West song), 1968
 "Country Girl" (Faron Young song), 1959
 "Country Girl" (Primal Scream song), 2006
 "Country Girl" (Rissi Palmer song), 2007
 "Country Girl (Shake It for Me)", by Luke Bryan, 2011
 "Country Girl", by Black Sabbath from Mob Rules, 1981
 "Country Girl", by Brinsley Schwarz from Despite It All, 1970
 "Country Girl", by Nazareth from Nazareth, 1971
 "Country Girls" (Jess Moskaluke song), 2019
 "Country Girls" (John Schneider song), 1984
 "Country Girls", by Little River Band from After Hours, 1976

See also
 The Country Girl (disambiguation)